Jon Harlan Livezey (born December 8, 1938) is an American politician and lawyer from Maryland. He served as a member of the Maryland House of Delegates, representing Harford County, from 1971 to 1974.

Early life
Jon Harlan Livezey was born on December 8, 1938, in Baltimore, Maryland, to Henry Kenneth Livezey. He attended Harford County Public Schools and graduated from Aberdeen High School. He graduated from Johns Hopkins University with a Bachelor of Arts in 1960 and was a member of the Army Reserve Officers' Training Corps. He graduated from the University of Maryland School of Law with a Bachelor of Laws in 1963. He was admitted to the bar in Maryland in 1963.

Career
Livezey served in the United States Army. He works as an attorney and was counsel to the Harford County Board of Election Supervisors from 1967 to 1969.

Livezey is a Republican. He served in the Maryland House of Delegates, representing Harford County, from 1971 to 1974.

Livezey served as president of the Harford County Historical Society from 1970 to 1972. Livezey served as the president of the Harford County Bar Association in 1988.

Personal life
Livezey married Mary Lynne Thompson of Glen Arm, Maryland, on May 29, 1978.

References

1938 births
Living people
Politicians from Baltimore
People from Harford County, Maryland
Johns Hopkins University alumni
University of Maryland Francis King Carey School of Law alumni
Republican Party members of the Maryland House of Delegates
Maryland lawyers
United States Army officer trainees